Ahmad Vaezi (born 1963) is an Iranian philosopher, scholar and clergyman. As of 2023, he is the chief of Islamic propagation office of the Center for the Islamic Iranian Model of Progress in Qom.

Early life and education
Ahmad Vaezi was born in Rey, Iran, in 1963. He entered Qom seminary in 1982 and studied preliminary courses in religious sciences in 1986. He then took courses in Islamic jurisprudence, including the classes of scholars such as Ayatollah Hossein Vahid Khorasani, Shiekh Jawad Tabrizi, Seyed Kazem Haeri, and Sadeq Larijani. Mastering Philosophy under Ayatollah Abdollah Javadi-Amoli, Mohammad-Taqi Mesbah-Yazdi and H. Fayazi, he then started his professional studies in Western Philosophy and Modern Transmitted Sciences.

Career
He has been a university lecturer since 1987 and has taught in many Iranian and International universities. In 2001 he moved to the United Kingdom to teach at Cambridge University, and at the Islamic College and London Seminary. His major research interests are Modern Transmitted Sciences and Western Philosophy and, since 2006, he has focused on Hermeneutics and Political Thought.

Bibliography
He has written many books in different spheres as follow:
Alternation of theological understanding
Theological society, Civilized society
Man from Islam perspective
Bedaye Al Hekam (the Beginning of Wisdoms)
Theocracy
Islamic rule
Introduction to Hermeneutics
Shia Political thought.
 theory of context

See also
 Mahmoud Mar'ashi Najafi
 Seyed Ali Asghar Dastgheib
 Rasul Jafarian

References

External links

20th-century Iranian philosophers
1963 births
People from Ray, Iran
Living people
Qom Seminary alumni
21st-century Iranian philosophers